GOLD 905 is an English radio station of Mediacorp in Singapore. It broadcasts classic hits from the 1970s, 1980s and 1990s similar to that of BBC Radio 2 in the United Kingdom, 2UE, Magic 1278 and 4BH in Australia, Lite in Malaysia and Magic in New Zealand. Their DJs include Brian Richmond, who has more than 40 years of experience in the radio industry. It is one of the nation's oldest stations, tracing its origins back to the beginning of regulated radio broadcasting in Singapore in 1936.

Content

Music
Gold 905 adopts the Classic hits radio format, with the majority of the playlist consisting of music from the 1970s, 1980s and 1990s. The station has both general daytime programmes and specialist programmes of particular types or eras of music.

On weekday nights, Nite Flight features ballads, soft rock and easy listening hits. On Saturday evenings, Rock of Ages features classic rock, and Solid Gold features disco and dance music. This specialist programming previously ran from 6pm to 2am in February 2016, but was changed to run only from 8pm to midnight in November 2017. On Sunday mornings, The Vintage Showcase features Oldies music from the 1960s and 1970s.

News and current affairs
News, sports, weather, and traffic bulletins on Gold 905 generally air at 53–57 minutes past the hour.

The traffic updates are aired at 15-minute intervals in the mornings (6-10am), and 30-minute intervals for the rest of the day (12-8pm).

The news bulletin is provided by CNA938. Prior to November 2017, the news bulletin was only aired during primetime hours (6am-12pm, 5-8pm). In November 2017, Mediacorp mandated the news bulletin to be aired every hour. On weekdays, the news is aired hourly from 6:54am to 8:54pm, while on weekends the news is aired hourly from 10:54am to 7:54pm.

The commercial breaks are at :12, :24, :42, :54 minutes past the hour, and the news bulletin is aired at the :54 break.

See also
List of radio stations in Singapore
Mediacorp

References

External links
GOLD 905's Official Website

Radio stations established in 1936
1936 establishments in Singapore
Radio stations in Singapore